Business ethics (also known as Corporate Ethics) is a form of applied ethics or professional ethics, that examines ethical principles and moral or ethical problems that can arise in a business environment. It applies to all aspects of business conduct and is relevant to the conduct of individuals and entire organizations. These ethics originate from individuals, organizational statements or the legal system. These norms, values, ethical, and unethical practices are the principles that guide a business.

Business ethics refers to contemporary organizational standards, principles, sets of values and norms that govern the actions and behavior of an individual in the business organization. Business ethics have two dimensions, normative business ethics or descriptive business ethics. As a corporate practice and a career specialization, the field is primarily normative. Academics attempting to understand business behavior employ descriptive methods. The range and quantity of business ethical issues reflects the interaction of profit-maximizing behavior with non-economic concerns.

Interest in business ethics accelerated dramatically during the 1980s and 1990s, both within major corporations and within academia. For example, most major corporations today promote their commitment to non-economic values under headings such as ethics codes and social responsibility charters.

Adam Smith said in 1776, "People of the same trade seldom meet together, even for merriment and diversion, but the conversation ends in a conspiracy against the public, or in some contrivance to raise prices." Governments use laws and regulations to point business behavior in what they perceive to be beneficial directions. Ethics implicitly regulates areas and details of behavior that lie beyond governmental control. The emergence of large corporations with limited relationships and sensitivity to the communities in which they operate accelerated the development of formal ethics regimes.

Maintaining an ethical status is the responsibility of the manager of the business. According to a 1990 article in the Journal of Business Ethics, "Managing ethical behavior is one of the most pervasive and complex problems facing business organizations today."

History
Business ethics reflect the norms of each historical period. As time passes, norms evolve, causing accepted behaviors to become objectionable. Business ethics and the resulting behavior evolved as well. Business was involved in slavery, colonialism, and the Cold War.

The term 'business ethics' came into common use in the United States in the early 1970s. By the mid-1980s at least 500 courses in business ethics reached 40,000 students, using some twenty textbooks and at least ten casebooks supported by professional societies, centers and journals of business ethics. The Society for Business Ethics was founded in 1980. European business schools adopted business ethics after 1987 commencing with the European Business Ethics Network. In 1982 the first single-authored books in the field appeared.

Firms began highlighting their ethical stature in the late 1980s and early 1990s, possibly in an attempt to distance themselves from the business scandals of the day, such as the savings and loan crisis. The concept of business ethics caught the attention of academics, media and business firms by the end of the Cold War. However, criticism of business practices was attacked for infringing the freedom of entrepreneurs and critics were accused of supporting communists. This scuttled the discourse of business ethics both in media and academia. The Defense Industry Initiative on Business Ethics and Conduct (DII) was created to support corporate ethical conduct. This era began the belief and support of self-regulation and free trade, which lifted tariffs and barriers and allowed businesses to merge and divest in an increasing global atmosphere.

Religious and philosophical origins 
One of the earliest written treatments of business ethics is found in the Tirukkuṛaḷ, a Tamil book dated variously from 300 BCE to the 7th century CE and attributed to Thiruvalluvar. Many verses discuss business ethics, in particular, verse 113, adapting to a changing environment in verses 474, 426, and 140, learning the intricacies of different tasks in verses 462 and 677.

Overview
Business ethics reflects the philosophy of business, of which one aim is to determine the fundamental purposes of a company. Business purpose expresses the company's reason for existing. Modern discussion on the purpose of business has been freshened by views from thinkers such as Richard R. Ellesworth, Peter Drucker, and Nikos Mourkogiannis: Traditional views held that the purpose of a business organization is to make profit for shareholders. Nevertheless, the purpose of maximizing shareholder's wealth often "fails to energize employees". In practice, many non-shareholders also benefit from a firm's economic activity, among them empolyees through contractual compensation and its broader impact, consumers by the tangible or non-tangible value derived from their purchase choices; society as a whole through taxation and/or the company's involvement in social action when it occurs. On the other hand, if a company's purpose is to maximize shareholder returns, then sacrificing profits for other concerns is a violation of its fiduciary responsibility. Corporate entities are legal persons but this does not mean they are legally entitled to all of the rights and liabilities as natural persons.

Ethics are the rules or standards that govern our decisions on a daily basis. Many consider "ethics" with conscience or a simplistic sense of "right" and "wrong". Others would say that ethics is an internal code that governs an individual's conduct, ingrained into each person by family, faith, tradition, community, laws, and personal mores. Corporations and professional organizations, particularly licensing boards, generally will have a written code of ethics that governs standards of professional conduct expected of all in the field.
It is important to note that "law" and "ethics" are not synonymous, nor are the "legal" and "ethical" courses of action in a given situation necessarily the same. Statutes and regulations passed by legislative bodies and administrative boards set forth the "law". Slavery once was legal in the US, but one certainly would not say enslaving another was an "ethical" act.

Economist Milton Friedman wrote that corporate executives' "responsibility ... generally will be to make as much money as possible while conforming to their basic rules of the society, both those embodied in law and those embodied in ethical custom". Friedman also said, "the only entities who can have responsibilities are individuals ... A business cannot have responsibilities. So the question is, do corporate executives, provided they stay within the law, have responsibilities in their business activities other than to make as much money for their stockholders as possible? And my answer to that is, no, they do not." This view is known as the Friedman doctrine. A multi-country 2011 survey found support for this view among the "informed public" ranging from 30 to 80%. Ronald Duska and Jacques Cory have described Friedman's argument as consequentialist or utilitarian rather than pragmatic: Friedman's argument implies that unrestrained corporate freedom would benefit the most people in the long term. Duska argued that Friedman failed to differentiate two very different aspects of business: (1) the motive of individuals, who are generally motivated by profit to participate in business, and (2) the socially sanctioned purpose of business, or the reason why people allow businesses to exist, which is to provide goods and services to people. So Friedman was wrong that making a profit is the only concern of business, Duska argued.

Peter Drucker once said, "There is neither a separate ethics of business nor is one needed", implying that standards of personal ethics cover all business situations. However, Drucker in another instance said that the ultimate responsibility of company directors is not to harm—primum non nocere.

Another view of business is that it must exhibit corporate social responsibility (CSR): an umbrella term indicating that an ethical business must act as a responsible citizen of the communities in which it operates even at the cost of profits or other goals. In the US and most other nations, corporate entities are legally treated as persons in some respects. For example, they can hold title to property, sue and be sued and are subject to taxation, although their free speech rights are limited. This can be interpreted to imply that they have independent ethical responsibilities. Duska argued that stakeholders expect a business to be ethical and that violating that expectation must be counterproductive for the business.

Ethical issues include the rights and duties between a company and its employees, suppliers, customers and neighbors, its fiduciary responsibility to its shareholders. Issues concerning relations between different companies include hostile take-overs and industrial espionage. Related issues include corporate governance; corporate social entrepreneurship; political contributions; legal issues such as the ethical debate over introducing a crime of corporate manslaughter; and the marketing of corporations' ethics policies.
According to research published by the Institute of Business Ethics and Ipsos MORI in late 2012, the three major areas of public concern regarding business ethics in Britain are executive pay, corporate tax avoidance and bribery and corruption.

Ethical standards of an entire organization can be damaged if a corporate psychopath is in charge. This will not only affect the company and its outcome but the employees who work under a corporate psychopath. The way a corporate psychopath can rise in a company is by their manipulation, scheming, and bullying. They do this in a way that can hide their true character and intentions within a company.

Functional business areas

Finance
Fundamentally, finance is a social science discipline. The discipline borders behavioral economics, sociology, economics, accounting and management. It concerns technical issues such as the mix of debt and equity, dividend policy, the evaluation of alternative investment projects, options, futures, swaps, and other derivatives, portfolio diversification and many others. Finance is often mistaken by the people to be a discipline free from ethical burdens. The 2008 financial crisis caused critics to challenge the ethics of the executives in charge of U.S. and European financial institutions and financial regulatory bodies. Finance ethics is overlooked for another reason—issues in finance are often addressed as matters of law rather than ethics.

Finance paradigm

Aristotle said, "the end and purpose of the polis is the good life". Adam Smith characterized the good life in terms of material goods and intellectual and moral excellences of character. Smith in his The Wealth of Nations commented, "All for ourselves, and nothing for other people, seems, in every age of the world, to have been the vile maxim of the masters of mankind." However, a section of economists influenced by the ideology of neoliberalism, interpreted the objective of economics to be maximization of economic growth through accelerated consumption and production of goods and services. Neoliberal ideology promoted finance from its position as a component of economics to its core. Proponents of the ideology hold that unrestricted financial flows, if redeemed from the shackles of "financial repressions", best help impoverished nations to grow. The theory holds that open financial systems accelerate economic growth by encouraging foreign capital inflows, thereby enabling higher levels of savings, investment, employment, productivity and "welfare", along with containing corruption. Neoliberals recommended that governments open their financial systems to the global market with minimal regulation over capital flows. The recommendations however, met with criticisms from various schools of ethical philosophy. Some pragmatic ethicists, found these claims to be unfalsifiable and a priori, although neither of these makes the recommendations false or unethical per se. Raising economic growth to the highest value necessarily means that welfare is subordinate, although advocates dispute this saying that economic growth provides more welfare than known alternatives. Since history shows that neither regulated nor unregulated firms always behave ethically, neither regime offers an ethical panacea.

Neoliberal recommendations to developing countries to unconditionally open up their economies to transnational finance corporations was fiercely contested by some ethicists. The claim that deregulation and the opening up of economies would reduce corruption was also contested.

Dobson observes, "a rational agent is simply one who pursues personal material advantage ad infinitum. In essence, to be rational in finance is to be individualistic, materialistic, and competitive. Business is a game played by individuals, as with all games the object is to win, and winning is measured in terms solely of material wealth. Within the discipline, this rationality concept is never questioned, and has indeed become the theory-of-the-firm's sine qua non". Financial ethics is in this view a mathematical function of shareholder wealth. Such simplifying assumptions were once necessary for the construction of mathematically robust models. However, signalling theory and agency theory extended the paradigm to greater realism.

Other issues
Fairness in trading practices, trading conditions, financial contracting, sales practices, consultancy services, tax payments, internal audit, external audit and executive compensation also, fall under the umbrella of finance and accounting. Particular corporate ethical/legal abuses include: creative accounting, earnings management, misleading financial analysis, insider trading, securities fraud, bribery/kickbacks and facilitation payments. Outside of corporations, bucket shops and forex scams are criminal manipulations of financial markets. Cases include accounting scandals, Enron, WorldCom and Satyam.

Human resource management
Human resource management occupies the sphere of activity of recruitment selection, orientation, performance appraisal, training and development, industrial relations and health and safety issues. Business Ethicists differ in their orientation towards labor ethics. Some assess human resource policies according to whether they support an egalitarian workplace and the dignity of labor.

Issues including employment itself, privacy, compensation in accord with comparable worth, collective bargaining (and/or its opposite) can be seen either as inalienable rights or as negotiable.
Discrimination by age (preferring the young or the old), gender/sexual harassment, race, religion, disability, weight and attractiveness. A common approach to remedying discrimination is affirmative action.

Once hired, employees have the right to the occasional cost of living increases, as well as raises based on merit. Promotions, however, are not a right, and there are often fewer openings than qualified applicants. It may seem unfair if an employee who has been with a company longer is passed over for a promotion, but it is not unethical. It is only unethical if the employer did not give the employee proper consideration or used improper criteria for the promotion. Each employer should know the distinction between what is unethical and what is illegal. If an action is illegal it is breaking the law but if an action seems morally incorrect that is unethical. In the workplace what is unethical does not mean illegal and should follow the guidelines put in place by OSHA, EEOC, and other law binding entities.

Potential employees have ethical obligations to employers, involving intellectual property protection and whistle-blowing.

Employers must consider workplace safety, which may involve modifying the workplace, or providing appropriate training or hazard disclosure. This differentiates on the location and type of work that is taking place and can need to comply with the standards to protect employees and non-employees under workplace safety.

Larger economic issues such as immigration, trade policy, globalization and trade unionism affect workplaces and have an ethical dimension, but are often beyond the purview of individual companies.

Trade unions
Trade unions, for example, may push employers to establish due process for workers, but may also cause job loss by demanding unsustainable compensation and work rules.

Unionized workplaces may confront union busting and strike breaking and face the ethical implications of work rules that advantage some workers over others.

Management strategy
Among the many people management strategies that companies employ are a "soft" approach that regards employees as a source of creative energy and participants in workplace decision making, a "hard" version explicitly focused on control and Theory Z that emphasizes philosophy, culture and consensus. None ensure ethical behavior. Some studies claim that sustainable success requires a humanely treated and satisfied workforce.

Sales and marketing

Marketing ethics came of age only as late as the 1990s. Marketing ethics was approached from ethical perspectives of virtue or virtue ethics, deontology, consequentialism, pragmatism and relativism.

Ethics in marketing deals with the principles, values and/or ideas by which marketers (and marketing institutions) ought to act. Marketing ethics is also contested terrain, beyond the previously described issue of potential conflicts between profitability and other concerns. Ethical marketing issues include marketing redundant or dangerous products/services, transparency about environmental risks, transparency about product ingredients such as genetically modified organisms possible health risks, financial risks, security risks, etc., respect for consumer privacy and autonomy, advertising truthfulness and fairness in pricing & distribution.

According to Borgerson, and Schroeder (2008), marketing can influence individuals' perceptions of and interactions with other people, implying an ethical responsibility to avoid distorting those perceptions and interactions.

Marketing ethics involves pricing practices, including illegal actions such as price fixing and legal actions including price discrimination and price skimming. Certain promotional activities have drawn fire, including greenwashing, bait and switch, shilling, viral marketing, spam (electronic), pyramid schemes and multi-level marketing. Advertising has raised objections about attack ads, subliminal messages, sex in advertising and marketing in schools.

Inter-organizational relationships 
Scholars in business and management have paid much attention to the ethical issues in the different forms of relationships between organizations such as buyer-supplier relationships, networks, alliances, or joint ventures. Drawing in particular on Transaction Cost Theory and Agency Theory, they note the risk of opportunistic and unethical practices between partners through, for instance, shirking, poaching, and other deceitful behaviors. In turn, research on inter-organizational relationships has observed the role of formal and informal mechanisms to both prevent unethical practices and mitigate their consequences. It especially discusses the importance of formal contracts and relational norms between partners to manage ethical issues.

Emerging issues
Being the most important element of a business, stakeholders' main concern is to determine whether or not the business is behaving ethically or unethically. The business's actions and decisions should be primarily ethical before it happens to become an ethical or even legal issue. "In the case of the government, community, and society what was merely an ethical issue can become a legal debate and eventually law."
Some emerging ethical issues are:
 Corporate Environmental Responsibility: Businesses impacts on eco-systemic environments can no longer be neglected and ecosystems' impacts on business activities are becoming more imminent.
 Fairness: The three aspects that motivate people to be fair is; equality, optimization, and reciprocity. Fairness is the quality of being just, equitable, and impartial.
 Misuse of company's times and resources: This particular topic may not seem to be a very common one, but it is very important, as it costs a company billions of dollars on a yearly basis. This misuse is from late arrivals, leaving early, long lunch breaks, inappropriate sick days etc. This has been observed as a major form of misconduct in businesses today. One of the greatest ways employees participate in the misuse of company's time and resources is by using the company computer for personal use.
 Consumer fraud: There are many different types of fraud, namely; friendly fraud, return fraud, wardrobing, price arbitrage, returning stolen goods. Fraud is a major unethical practice within businesses which should be paid special attention. Consumer fraud is when consumers attempt to deceive businesses for their very own benefit.
 Abusive behavior: A common ethical issue among employees. Abusive behavior consists of inflicting intimidating acts on other employees. Such acts include harassing, using profanity, threatening someone physically and insulting them, and being annoying.

Production
This area of business ethics usually deals with the duties of a company to ensure that products and production processes do not needlessly cause harm. Since few goods and services can be produced and consumed with zero risks, determining the ethical course can be problematic. In some case, consumers demand products that harm them, such as tobacco products. Production may have environmental impacts, including pollution, habitat destruction and urban sprawl. The downstream effects of technologies nuclear power, genetically modified food and mobile phones may not be well understood. While the precautionary principle may prohibit introducing new technology whose consequences are not fully understood, that principle would have prohibited the newest technology introduced since the industrial revolution. Product testing protocols have been attacked for violating the rights of both humans and animals. There are sources that provide information on companies that are environmentally responsible or do not test on animals.

Property

The etymological root of property is the Latin , which refers to 'nature', 'quality', 'one's own', 'special characteristic', 'proper', 'intrinsic', 'inherent', 'regular', 'normal', 'genuine', 'thorough, complete, perfect' etc. The word property is value loaded and associated with the personal qualities of propriety and respectability, also implies questions relating to ownership. A 'proper' person owns and is true to herself or himself, and is thus genuine, perfect and pure.

Modern history of property rights
Modern discourse on property emerged by the turn of the 17th century within theological discussions of that time. For instance, John Locke justified property rights saying that God had made "the earth, and all inferior creatures, [in] common to all men".

In 1802 utilitarian Jeremy Bentham stated, "property and law are born together and die together".

One argument for property ownership is that it enhances individual liberty by extending the line of non-interference by the state or others around the person. Seen from this perspective, property right is absolute and property has a special and distinctive character that precedes its legal protection. Blackstone conceptualized property as the "sole and despotic dominion which one man claims and exercises over the external things of the world, in total exclusion of the right of any other individual in the universe".

Slaves as property
During the seventeenth and eighteenth centuries, slavery spread to European colonies including America, where colonial legislatures defined the legal status of slaves as a form of property. During this time settlers began the centuries-long process of dispossessing the natives of America of millions of acres of land.

Combined with theological justification, the property was taken to be essentially natural ordained by God. Property, which later gained meaning as ownership and appeared natural to Locke, Jefferson and to many of the 18th and 19th century intellectuals as land, labor or idea, and property right over slaves had the same theological and essentialized justification It was even held that the property in slaves was a sacred right. Wiecek noted, "slavery was more clearly and explicitly established under the Constitution as it had been under the Articles". Accordingly, US Supreme Court Chief Justice Roger B. Taney in his 1857 judgment stated, "The right of property in a slave is distinctly and expressly affirmed in the Constitution".

Natural right vs social construct
Neoliberals hold that private property rights are a non-negotiable natural right. Davies counters with "property is no different from other legal categories in that it is simply a consequence of the significance attached by law to the relationships between legal persons." Singer claims, "Property is a form of power, and the distribution of power is a political problem of the highest order". Rose finds, Property' is only an effect, a construction, of relationships between people, meaning that its objective character is contestable. Persons and things, are 'constituted' or 'fabricated' by legal and other normative techniques." Singer observes, "A private property regime is not, after all, a Hobbesian state of nature; it requires a working legal system that can define, allocate, and enforce property rights." Davis claims that common law theory generally favors the view that "property is not essentially a 'right to a thing', but rather a separable bundle of rights subsisting between persons which may vary according to the context and the object which is at stake".

In common parlance property rights involve a bundle of rights including occupancy, use and enjoyment, and the right to sell, devise, give, or lease all or part of these rights. Custodians of property have obligations as well as rights. Michelman writes, "A property regime thus depends on a great deal of cooperation, trustworthiness, and self-restraint among the people who enjoy it."

Menon claims that the autonomous individual, responsible for his/her own existence is a cultural construct moulded by Western culture rather than the truth about the human condition. Penner views property as an "illusion"—a "normative phantasm" without substance.

In the neoliberal literature, the property is part of the private side of a public/private dichotomy and acts a counterweight to state power. Davies counters that "any space may be subject to plural meanings or appropriations which do not necessarily come into conflict".

Private property has never been a universal doctrine, although since the end of the Cold War is it has become nearly so. Some societies, e.g., Native American bands, held land, if not all property, in common. When groups came into conflict, the victor often appropriated the loser's property. The rights paradigm tended to stabilize the distribution of property holdings on the presumption that title had been lawfully acquired.

Property does not exist in isolation, and so property rights too. Bryan claimed that property rights describe relations among people and not just relations between people and things Singer holds that the idea that owners have no legal obligations to others wrongly supposes that property rights hardly ever conflict with other legally protected interests. Singer continues implying that legal realists "did not take the character and structure of social relations as an important independent factor in choosing the rules that govern market life". Ethics of property rights begins with recognizing the vacuous nature of the notion of property.

Intellectual property

Intellectual property (IP) encompasses expressions of ideas, thoughts, codes, and information. "Intellectual property rights" (IPR) treat IP as a kind of real property, subject to analogous protections, rather than as a reproducible good or service. Boldrin and Levine argue that "government does not ordinarily enforce monopolies for producers of other goods. This is because it is widely recognized that monopoly creates many social costs. Intellectual monopoly is no different in this respect. The question we address is whether it also creates social benefits commensurate with these social costs."

International standards relating to Intellectual Property Rights are enforced through Agreement on Trade-Related Aspects of Intellectual Property Rights. In the US, IP other than copyrights is regulated by the United States Patent and Trademark Office.

The US Constitution included the power to protect intellectual property, empowering the Federal government "to promote the progress of science and useful arts, by securing for limited times to authors and inventors the exclusive right to their respective writings and discoveries". Boldrin and Levine see no value in such state-enforced monopolies stating, "we ordinarily think of innovative monopoly as an oxymoron. Further, they comment, 'intellectual property' "is not like ordinary property at all, but constitutes a government grant of a costly and dangerous private monopoly over ideas. We show through theory and example that intellectual monopoly is not necessary for innovation and as a practical matter is damaging to growth, prosperity, and liberty". Steelman defends patent monopolies, writing, "Consider prescription drugs, for instance. Such drugs have benefited millions of people, improving or extending their lives. Patent protection enables drug companies to recoup their development costs because for a specific period of time they have the sole right to manufacture and distribute the products they have invented." The court cases by 39 pharmaceutical companies against South Africa's 1997 Medicines and Related Substances Control Amendment Act, which intended to provide affordable HIV medicines has been cited as a harmful effect of patents.

One attack on IPR is moral rather than utilitarian, claiming that inventions are mostly a collective, cumulative, path dependent, social creation and therefore, no one person or firm should be able to monopolize them even for a limited period. The opposing argument is that the benefits of innovation arrive sooner when patents encourage innovators and their investors to increase their commitments.

Roderick T. Long, a libertarian philosopher, argued:

Machlup concluded that patents do not have the intended effect of enhancing innovation. Self-declared anarchist Proudhon, in his 1847 seminal work noted, "Monopoly is the natural opposite of competition," and continued, "Competition is the vital force which animates the collective being: to destroy it, if such a supposition were possible, would be to kill society."

Mindeli and Pipiya argued that the knowledge economy is an economy of abundance because it relies on the "infinite potential" of knowledge and ideas rather than on the limited resources of natural resources, labor and capital. Allison envisioned an egalitarian distribution of knowledge. Kinsella claimed that IPR create artificial scarcity and reduce equality. Bouckaert wrote, "Natural scarcity is that which follows from the relationship between man and nature. Scarcity is natural when it is possible to conceive of it before any human, institutional, contractual arrangement. Artificial scarcity, on the other hand, is the outcome of such arrangements. Artificial scarcity can hardly serve as a justification for the legal framework that causes that scarcity. Such an argument would be completely circular. On the contrary, artificial scarcity itself needs a justification" Corporations fund much IP creation and can acquire IP they do not create, to which Menon and others have objected. Andersen claims that IPR has increasingly become an instrument in eroding public domain.

Ethical and legal issues include patent infringement, copyright infringement, trademark infringement, patent and copyright misuse, submarine patents, biological patents, patent, copyright and trademark trolling, employee raiding and monopolizing talent, bioprospecting, biopiracy and industrial espionage, digital rights management.

Notable IP copyright cases include A&M Records, Inc. v. Napster, Inc., Eldred v. Ashcroft, and Disney's lawsuit against the Air Pirates.

International issues
While business ethics emerged as a field in the 1970s, international business ethics did not emerge until the late 1990s, looking back on the international developments of that decade. Many new practical issues arose out of the international context of business. Theoretical issues such as cultural relativity of ethical values receive more emphasis in this field. Other, older issues can be grouped here as well. Issues and subfields include:

The search for universal values as a basis for international commercial behavior
Comparison of business ethical traditions in different countries and on the basis of their respective GDP and corruption rankings
Comparison of business ethical traditions from various religious perspectives
Ethical issues arising out of international business transactions—e.g., bioprospecting and biopiracy in the pharmaceutical industry; the fair trade movement; transfer pricing.
Issues such as globalization and cultural imperialism
Varying global standards—e.g., the use of child labor
The way in which multinationals take advantage of international differences, such as outsourcing production (e.g. clothes) and services (e.g. call centers) to low-wage countries
The permissibility of international commerce with pariah states

Foreign countries often use dumping as a competitive threat, selling products at prices lower than their normal value. This can lead to problems in domestic markets. It becomes difficult for these markets to compete with the pricing set by foreign markets. In 2009, the International Trade Commission has been researching anti-dumping laws. Dumping is often seen as an ethical issue, as larger companies are taking advantage of other less economically advanced companies.

Issues
Ethical issues often arise in business settings, whether through business transactions or forming new business relationships. It also has a huge focus in the auditing field whereby the type of verification can be directly dictated by ethical theory. An ethical issue in a business atmosphere may refer to any situation that requires business associates as individuals, or as a group (for example, a department or firm) to evaluate the morality of specific actions, and subsequently, make a decision amongst the choices. Some ethical issues of particular concern in today's evolving business market include such topics as: honesty, integrity, professional behaviors, environmental issues, harassment, and fraud to name a few. From a 2009 National Business Ethics survey, it was found that types of employee-observed ethical misconduct included abusive behavior (at a rate of 22 percent), discrimination (at a rate of 14 percent), improper hiring practices (at a rate of 10 percent), and company resource abuse (at a rate of percent).

The ethical issues associated with honesty are widespread and vary greatly in business, from the misuse of company time or resources to lying with malicious intent, engaging in bribery, or creating conflicts of interest within an organization. Honesty encompasses wholly the truthful speech and actions of an individual. Some cultures and belief systems even consider honesty to be an essential pillar of life, such as Confucianism and Buddhism (referred to as sacca, part of the Four Noble Truths). Many employees lie in order to reach goals, avoid assignments or negative issues; however, sacrificing honesty in order to gain status or reap rewards poses potential problems for the overall ethical culture organization, and jeopardizes organizational goals in the long run. Using company time or resources for personal use is also, commonly viewed as unethical because it boils down to stealing from the company. The misuse of resources costs companies billions of dollars each year, averaging about 4.25 hours per week of stolen time alone, and employees' abuse of Internet services is another main concern. Bribery, on the other hand, is not only considered unethical is business practices, but it is also illegal. In accordance with this, the Foreign Corrupt Practices Act was established in 1977 to deter international businesses from giving or receiving unwarranted payments and gifts that were intended to influence the decisions of executives and political officials. Although, small payments known as facilitation payments will not be considered unlawful under the Foreign Corrupt Practices Act if they are used towards regular public governance activities, such as permits or licenses.

Influential factors on business ethics 
Many aspects of the work environment influence an individual's decision-making regarding ethics in the business world. When an individual is on the path of growing a company, many outside influences can pressure them to perform a certain way. The core of the person's performance in the workplace is rooted in their personal code of behavior. A person's personal code of ethics encompasses many different qualities such as integrity, honesty, communication, respect, compassion, and common goals. In addition, the ethical standards set forth by a person's superior(s) often translate into their own code of ethics. The company's policy is the 'umbrella' of ethics that play a major role in the personal development and decision-making processes that people make with respect to ethical behavior.

The ethics of a company and its individuals are heavily influenced by the state of their country. If a country is heavily plagued with poverty, large corporations continuously grow, but smaller companies begin to wither and are then forced to adapt and scavenge for any method of survival. As a result, the leadership of the company is often tempted to participate in unethical methods to obtain new business opportunities. Additionally, Social Media is arguably the most influential factor in ethics. The immediate access to so much information and the opinions of millions highly influence people's behaviors. The desire to conform with what is portrayed as the norm often manipulates our idea of what is morally and ethically sound. Popular trends on social media and the instant gratification that is received from participating in such quickly distort people's ideas and decisions.

Economic systems
Political economy and political philosophy have ethical implications, particularly regarding the distribution of economic benefits. John Rawls and Robert Nozick are both notable contributors. For example, Rawls has been interpreted as offering a critique of offshore outsourcing on social contract grounds.

Law and regulation
Laws are the written statutes, codes, and opinions of government organizations by which citizens, businesses, and persons present within a jurisdiction are expected to govern themselves or face legal sanction. Sanctions for violating the law can include (a) civil penalties, such as fines, pecuniary damages, and loss of licenses, property, rights, or privileges; (b) criminal penalties, such as fines, probation, imprisonment, or a combination thereof; or (c) both civil and criminal penalties.

Very often it is held that business is not bound by any ethics other than abiding by the law. Milton Friedman is the pioneer of the view. He held that corporations have the obligation to make a profit within the framework of the legal system, nothing more. Friedman made it explicit that the duty of the business leaders is, "to make as much money as possible while conforming to the basic rules of the society, both those embodied in the law and those embodied in ethical custom". Ethics for Friedman is nothing more than abiding by customs and laws. The reduction of ethics to abidance to laws and customs, however, have drawn serious criticisms.

Counter to Friedman's logic it is observed that legal procedures are technocratic, bureaucratic, rigid and obligatory whereas ethical act is conscientious, voluntary choice beyond normativity. Law is retroactive. Crime precedes law. Law against crime, to be passed, the crime must have happened. Laws are blind to the crimes undefined in it. Further, as per law, "conduct is not criminal unless forbidden by law which gives advance warning that such conduct is criminal". Also, the law presumes the accused is innocent until proven guilty and that the state must establish the guilt of the accused beyond reasonable doubt. As per liberal laws followed in most of the democracies, until the government prosecutor proves the firm guilty with the limited resources available to her, the accused is considered to be innocent. Though the liberal premises of law is necessary to protect individuals from being persecuted by Government, it is not a sufficient mechanism to make firms morally accountable.

Implementation

Corporate policies

As part of more comprehensive compliance and ethics programs, many companies have formulated internal policies pertaining to the ethical conduct of employees. These policies can be simple exhortations in broad, highly generalized language (typically called a corporate ethics statement), or they can be more detailed policies, containing specific behavioral requirements (typically called corporate ethics codes). They are generally meant to identify the company's expectations of workers and to offer guidance on handling some of the more common ethical problems that might arise in the course of doing business. It is hoped that having such a policy will lead to greater ethical awareness, consistency in application, and the avoidance of ethical disasters.

An increasing number of companies also require employees to attend seminars regarding business conduct, which often include discussion of the company's policies, specific case studies, and legal requirements. Some companies even require their employees to sign agreements stating that they will abide by the company's rules of conduct.

Many companies are assessing the environmental factors that can lead employees to engage in unethical conduct. A competitive business environment may call for unethical behavior. Lying has become expected in fields such as trading. An example of this are the issues surrounding the unethical actions of the Salomon Brothers.

Not everyone supports corporate policies that govern ethical conduct. Some claim that ethical problems are better dealt with by depending upon employees to use their own judgment.

Others believe that corporate ethics policies are primarily rooted in utilitarian concerns and that they are mainly to limit the company's legal liability or to curry public favor by giving the appearance of being a good corporate citizen. Ideally, the company will avoid a lawsuit because its employees will follow the rules. Should a lawsuit occur, the company can claim that the problem would not have arisen if the employee had only followed the code properly.

Some corporations have tried to burnish their ethical image by creating whistle-blower protections, such as anonymity. In the case of Citi, they call this the Ethics Hotline. Though it is unclear whether firms such as Citi take offences reported to these hotlines seriously or not. Sometimes there is a disconnection between the company's code of ethics and the company's actual practices. Thus, whether or not such conduct is explicitly sanctioned by management, at worst, this makes the policy duplicitous, and, at best, it is merely a marketing tool.

Jones and Parker wrote, "Most of what we read under the name business ethics is either sentimental common sense or a set of excuses for being unpleasant." Many manuals are procedural form filling exercises unconcerned about the real ethical dilemmas. For instance, the US Department of Commerce ethics program treats business ethics as a set of instructions and procedures to be followed by 'ethics officers'., some others claim being ethical is just for the sake of being ethical. Business ethicists may trivialize the subject, offering standard answers that do not reflect the situation's complexity.

Richard DeGeorge wrote in regard to the importance of maintaining a corporate code:

Ethics officers
Following a series of fraud, corruption, and abuse scandals that affected the United States defense industry in the mid-1980s, the Defense Industry Initiative (DII) was created to promote ethical business practices and ethics management in multiple industries. Subsequent to these scandals, many organizations began appointing ethics officers (also referred to as "compliance" officers). In 1991, the Ethics & Compliance Officer Association —originally the Ethics Officer Association (EOA)—was founded at the Center for Business Ethics at Bentley University as a professional association for ethics and compliance officers.

The 1991 passing of the Federal Sentencing Guidelines for Organizations in 1991 was another factor in many companies appointing ethics/compliance officers. These guidelines, intended to assist judges with sentencing, set standards organizations must follow to obtain a reduction in sentence if they should be convicted of a federal offense.

Following the high-profile corporate scandals of companies like Enron, WorldCom and Tyco between 2001 and 2004, and following the passage of the Sarbanes–Oxley Act, many small and mid-sized companies also began to appoint ethics officers.

Often reporting to the chief executive officer, ethics officers focus on uncovering or preventing unethical and illegal actions. This is accomplished by assessing the ethical implications of the company's activities, making recommendations on ethical policies, and disseminating information to employees.

The effectiveness of ethics officers is not clear. The establishment of an ethics officer position is likely to be insufficient in driving ethical business practices without a corporate culture that values ethical behavior. These values and behaviors should be consistently and systemically supported by those at the top of the organization. Employees with strong community involvement, loyalty to employers, superiors or owners, smart work practices, trust among the team members do inculcate a corporate culture.

Sustainability initiatives
Many corporate and business strategies now include sustainability. In addition to the traditional environmental 'green' sustainability concerns, business ethics practices have expanded to include social sustainability. Social sustainability focuses on issues related to human capital in the business supply chain, such as worker's rights, working conditions, child labor, and human trafficking. Incorporation of these considerations is increasing, as consumers and procurement officials demand documentation of a business's compliance with national and international initiatives, guidelines, and standards. Many industries have organizations dedicated to verifying ethical delivery of products from start to finish, such as the Kimberly Process, which aims to stop the flow of conflict diamonds into international markets, or the Fair Wear Foundation, dedicated to sustainability and fairness in the garment industry.

As mentioned, initiatives in sustainability encompass "green" topics, as well as social sustainability. There are however many different ways in which sustainability initiatives can be implemented in a company.

Improving operations
An organization can implement sustainability initiatives by improving its operations and manufacturing process so as to make it more aligned with environment, social, and governance issues. Johnson & Johnson incorporates policies from the Universal Declaration of Human Rights, International Covenant on Civil and Political Rights and International Covenant on Economic, Social and Cultural Rights, applying these principles not only for members of its supply chain but also internal operations. Walmart has made commitments to doubling its truck fleet efficiency by 2015 by replacing 2/3rds of its fleet with more fuel-efficient trucks, including hybrids. Dell has integrated alternative, recycled, and recyclable materials in its products and packaging design, improving energy efficiency and design for end-of-life and recyclability. Dell plans to reduce the energy intensity of its product portfolio by 80% by 2020.

Board leadership
The board of a company can decide to lower executive compensation by a given percentage, and give the percentage of compensation to a specific cause. This is an effort which can only be implemented from the top, as it will affect the compensation of all executives in the company. In Alcoa, an aluminum company based in the US, "1/5th of executive cash compensation is tied to safety, diversity, and environmental stewardship, which includes greenhouse gas emission reductions and energy efficiency" (Best Practices). This is not usually the case for most companies, where we see the board take a uniform step towards the environment, social, and governance issues. This is only the case for companies that are directly linked to utilities, energy, or material industries, something which Alcoa as an aluminum company, falls in line with. Instead, formal committees focused on the environment, social, and governance issues are more usually seen in governance committees and audit committees, rather than the board of directors. "According to research analysis done by Pearl Meyer in support of the NACD 2017 Director Compensation Report shows that among 1,400 public companies reviewed, only slightly more than five percent of boards have a designated committee to address ESG issues." (How compensation can).

Management accountability
Similar to board leadership, creating steering committees and other types of committees specialized for sustainability, senior executives are identified who are held accountable for meeting and constantly improving sustainability goals.

Executive compensation
Introducing bonus schemes that reward executives for meeting non-financial performance goals including safety targets, greenhouse gas emissions, reduction targets, and goals engaging stakeholders to help shape the companies public policy positions. Companies such as Exelon have implemented policies like this.

Stakeholder engagement
Other companies will keep sustainability within its strategy and goals, presenting findings at shareholder meetings, and actively tracking metrics on sustainability. Companies such as PepsiCo, Heineken, and FIFCO take steps in this direction to implement sustainability initiatives. (Best Practices). Companies such as Coca-Cola have actively tried improve their efficiency of water usage, hiring 3rd party auditors to evaluate their water management approach. FIFCO has also led successfully led water-management initiatives.

Employee engagement
Implementation of sustainability projects through directly appealing to employees (typically through the human resource department) is another option for companies to implement sustainability. This involves integrating sustainability into the company culture, with hiring practices and employee training. General Electric is a company that is taking the lead in implementing initiatives in this manner. Bank of America directly engaged employees by implement LEED (leadership in Energy and Environmental Design) certified buildings, with a fifth of its building meeting these certifications.

Supply chain management
Establishing requirements for not only internal operations but also first-tier suppliers as well as second-tier suppliers to help drive environmental and social expectations further down the supply chain. Companies such as Starbucks, FIFCO and Ford Motor Company have implemented requirements that suppliers must meet to win their business. Starbucks has led efforts in engaging suppliers and local communities where they operate to accelerate investment in sustainable farming. Starbucks set a goal of ethically sourcing 100% of its coffee beans by 2015.

Transparency
By revealing decision-making data about how sustainability was reached, companies can give away insights that can help others across the industry and beyond make more sustainable decisions. Nike launched its "making app" in 2013 which released data about the sustainability in the materials it was using. This ultimately allows other companies to make more sustainable design decisions and create lower impact products.

Academic discipline
As an academic discipline, business ethics emerged in the 1970s. Since no academic business ethics journals or conferences existed, researchers published in general management journals and attended general conferences. Over time, specialized peer-reviewed journals appeared, and more researchers entered the field. Corporate scandals in the earlier 2000s increased the field's popularity. As of 2009, sixteen academic journals devoted to various business ethics issues existed, with Journal of Business Ethics and Business Ethics Quarterly considered the leaders. Journal of Business Ethics Education publishes articles specifically about education in business ethics.

The International Business Development Institute is a global non-profit organization that represents 217 nations and all 50 United States. It offers a Charter in Business Development that focuses on ethical business practices and standards. The Charter is directed by Harvard, MIT, and Fulbright Scholars, and it includes graduate-level coursework in economics, politics, marketing, management, technology, and legal aspects of business development as it pertains to business ethics. IBDI also oversees the International Business Development Institute of Asia which provides individuals living in 20 Asian nations the opportunity to earn the Charter.

Religious views
In Sharia law, followed by many Muslims, banking specifically prohibits charging interest on loans. Traditional Confucian thought discourages profit-seeking. Christianity offers the Golden Rule command, "Therefore all things whatsoever ye would that men should do to you, do ye even so to them: for this is the law and the prophets."
According to the article "Theory of the real economy", there is a more narrow point of view from the Christianity faith towards the relationship between ethics and religious traditions. This article stresses how Christianity is capable of establishing reliable boundaries for financial institutions. One criticism comes from Pope Benedict by describing the "damaging effects of the real economy of badly managed and largely speculative financial dealing." It is mentioned that Christianity has the potential to transform the nature of finance and investment but only if theologians and ethicist provide more evidence of what is real in the economic life. Business ethics receives an extensive treatment in Jewish thought and Rabbinic literature, both from an ethical (Mussar) and a legal (Halakha) perspective; see article Jewish business ethics for further discussion.
According to the article "Indian Philosophy and Business Ethics: A Review", by Chandrani Chattopadyay, Hindus follow "Dharma" as Business Ethics and unethical business practices are termed "Adharma". Businessmen are supposed to maintain steady-mindedness, self-purification, non-violence, concentration, clarity and control over senses. Books like Bhagavat Gita and Arthashastra contribute a lot towards conduct of ethical business.

Related disciplines
Business ethics is related to philosophy of economics, the branch of philosophy that deals with the philosophical, political, and ethical underpinnings of business and economics. Business ethics operates on the premise, for example, that the ethical operation of a private business is possible—those who dispute that premise, such as libertarian socialists (who contend that "business ethics" is an oxymoron) do so by definition outside of the domain of business ethics proper.

The philosophy of economics also deals with questions such as what, if any, are the social responsibilities of a business; business management theory; theories of individualism vs. collectivism; free will among participants in the marketplace; the role of self interest; invisible hand theories; the requirements of social justice; and natural rights, especially property rights, in relation to the business enterprise.

Business ethics is also related to political economy, which is economic analysis from political and historical perspectives. Political economy deals with the distributive consequences of economic actions.

See also

B Corporation (certification)
Business culture
Business law
Corporate behaviour
Corporate crime
Corporate social responsibility
Eastern Ethics in Business
Ethical code
Ethical consumerism
Ethical implications in contracts
Ethical job
Ethicism
Evil corporation
Moral psychology
Optimism bias
Organizational ethics
Penny stock scam
Philosophy and economics
Political corruption
Strategic misrepresentation
Strategic planning

Notes

References

Further reading

 
Applied ethics
Industrial and organizational psychology